Dhanushkodi is an abandoned town at the south-eastern tip of Pamban Island of the state of Tamil Nadu in India. The town was destroyed during the 1964 Rameswaram cyclone and remains uninhabited in the aftermath. Today only a few vendors and restaurants can be seen at Dhanushkodi during the day along with the ruins of the long destroyed town.

Geography
Dhanushkodi is on the tip of Pamban island, separated from the mainland by the Palk Strait.

Transport

The National Highway completed the 9.5-km-long road – 5 km from Mukuntharayar Chathiram to Dhanushkodi and 4.5 km from Dhanushkodi to Arichamunai. Until 2016, Dhanushkodi was reachable either on foot along the seashore or in jeeps. In 2016, a road was completed from the village of Mukundarayar Chathiram.

A metre gauge railway line connected Mandapam on mainland India to Dhanushkodi. Boat mail express ran from Chennai Egmore to Dhanushkodi till 1964 when the metre-gauge branch line from Pamban to Dhanushkodi was destroyed during the 1964 Dhanushkodi cyclone. In 2003, Southern Railway sent a project report to Ministry of Railways for re-laying a  railway line to Dhanushkodi from Rameswaram. The planning commission looked into the possibility of a new railway line between Dhanushkodi and Rameswaram in 2010.

1964 cyclone

The area around Rameswaram is prone to high-intensity geomorphic activity. A scientific study conducted by the Geological Survey of India indicated that the southern part of Dhanushkodi facing the Gulf of Mannar sank by almost  in 1948 and 1949, due to vertical tectonic movement of land parallel to the coastline.

On 17 December 1964, a tropical depression formed at 5°N 93°E in the South Andaman Sea. On 19 December, it intensified into a cyclonic storm. On 22 December, it crossed Vavuniya in Sri Lanka and made landfall at Dhanushkodi on the night of 22–23 December 1964.

An estimated 1,800 people died in the cyclonic storm on 22 December including 115 passengers on board the Pamban-Dhanushkodi passenger train. The entire town was marooned and the Government of Madras declared Dhanushkodi as a ghost town, unfit for living.

The wreckage of the Rameswaram-Dhanushkodi passenger train, which was hit by the cyclone and tidal waves that struck the area on December 22, lies half submerged here. More than 115 people died in the area-wide calamity 1964.12.31 (UPI Radiophoto)

The locomotive in the picture is B Class 4-6-0 No. 31376 built by North British.

Gallery

See also
 Dhanushkodi Tirtham
 Palk Strait bridge
 Kothandaramaswamy Temple
 Gulf of Mannar Marine National Park
 List of lost lands

References

External links

 Travel article on Dhanushkodi

Places in the Ramayana
Gulf of Mannar
India–Sri Lanka border crossings
Ghost towns in India
Populated places disestablished in 1964
1964 disestablishments in India